The 1986 Harvard Crimson football team was an American football team that represented Harvard University during the 1986 NCAA Division I-AA football season. The Crimson finished fifth in the Ivy League.

In their 16th year under head coach Joe Restic, the Crimson compiled a 3–7 record and were outscored 190 to 139. Scott C. Collins was the team captain.

Harvard's 3–4 conference record placed fifth in the Ivy League standings. The Crimson outscored Ivy opponents 132 to 108. 

Harvard played its home games at Harvard Stadium in the Allston neighborhood of Boston, Massachusetts.

Schedule

References

Harvard
Harvard Crimson football seasons
Harvard Crimson football
Harvard Crimson football